The Budalur block is a revenue block in the Thanjavur taluk of the Thanjavur district in Tamil Nadu, India. It has a total of 42 panchayat villages.

List of Panchayat Villages

References 

 

Revenue blocks of Thanjavur district